Ernesto Viceconte (2 January 1836 - 1877) was an Italian composer. Born in Naples, Viceconte was a child prodigy and was admitted to the Naples Conservatory at the age of 8. He composed 5 operas; three of which premiered at the Teatro di San Carlo: Evelina (1856), Luisa Strozzi (1862), and Selvaggia (1872). The latter work was his most successful composition. His compositional output also includes one symphony and some vocal works and sacred music.

References

1836 births
1877 deaths
Italian classical composers
Italian male classical composers
Italian opera composers
Male opera composers
Musicians from Naples
19th-century classical composers
19th-century Italian composers
19th-century Italian male musicians